2016 World Masters Athletics Championships is the 22nd in a series of World Masters Athletics Outdoor Championships
that took place in Perth, Australia from 26 October to 6 November 2016.

Prior to this year, the championships in this biennial series were in odd-numbered years. Beginning in 2016, the championships were held in even-numbered years.
  The change was made to avoid conflict with the quadrennial World Masters Games, which had been held in odd-numbered years since 2005.

The main venue was Western Australian Athletics Stadium,

which had a nine-lane mondotrack laid in 2014.

Supplemental venues included Ern Clark Athletic Centre, which also had a recently-upgraded eight-lane mondotrack.

Road walks and cross country were held at Alderbury and Perry Lakes Reserves in Floreat. Half marathon and marathon followed the banks of the Swan River, with start and finish at the WA Water Sports Club.

HBF Stadium served as the technical information centre.

Welcoming ceremony was held at Elizabeth Quay.

This championship was organized by World Masters Athletics (WMA) in coordination with a local organising committee.

The WMA is the global governing body of the sport of athletics for athletes 35 years of age or older, setting rules for masters athletics competition.

At the general assembly during this championship, a motion was passed to change two events after this edition of the series:

The marathon would be replaced by a half marathon.
The 10K road race would be replaced by the 10K race walk.

In addition to a full range of track and field events,

non-stadia events included 8K cross country, 10K race walk, 20K race walk, half marathon,

and marathon.

Results
Official results are archived at perth2016.

Past championships results are archived at WMA.

Additional archives are available from British Masters Athletic Federation

in HTML format,

from Český atletický as a searchable pdf,

from documents.pub as a searchable pdf,

and from Masters Athletics Western Australia as a pdf book.

Masters world records set at this championships are listed below and are from the list of world records in the pdf book unless otherwise noted.

More complete lists of medalists are contained in separate articles for women and for men.

Women

World records are listed below.

Men

World records are listed below.

References

External links

World Masters Athletics Championships
World Masters Athletics Championships
International athletics competitions hosted by Australia
World Masters Athletics Championships
Sports competitions in Perth, Western Australia
2010s in Perth, Western Australia
Masters athletics (track and field) records